Silver Max (foaled  March 8, 2009) is an American Thoroughbred racehorse and the winner of the 2013 Shadwell Turf Mile Stakes.

Career

Silver Max 's first race was on July 31, 2011 at Saratoga, where he came in second. He did not pick up his first win until January 13, 2012 at Gulfstream Park.

He went on a six race win streak starting on March 9, 2012. He won the Transylvania Stakes in April. He then won the American Turf Stakes on May 4, then the Arlington Classic Stakes on May 25th. He picked up a win at the Oliver Stakes on June 13, then capped off the streak with a win at the 2012 Commonwealth Derby on July 21.

His next graded race win came a year later as he won the Oceanport Stakes on July 28, 2013. Silver Max then won the Bernard Baruch Handicap on August 31, 2013. Then on October 5, 2013, he won the biggest race of his career when he captured his first Grade-1 win - the Shadwell Turf Mile Stakes.

2014 was his final season. His only win was at the June 28th, 2014 Firecracker Stakes. He failed to place on the podium in his last three races and finished his career off with a 6th place finish in the November 8th, 2014 River City Handicap.

In 2015, Silver Max was retired to stud.

Pedigree

References

2009 racehorse births
Racehorses bred in Kentucky
Racehorses trained in the United States
Thoroughbred family A1